Electronic may refer to:

Electronics, the science of how to control electric energy in semiconductor
Electronics (magazine), a defunct American trade journal
Electronic storage, the storage of data using an electronic device
Electronic commerce or e-commerce, the trading in products or services using computer networks, such as the Internet
Electronic publishing or e-publishing, the digital publication of books and magazines using computer networks, such as the Internet
Electronic engineering, an electrical engineering discipline

Entertainment
Electronic (band), an English alternative dance band
Electronic (album), the self-titled debut album by British band Electronic
Electronic music, a music genre
Electronic musical instrument
Electronic game, a game that employs electronics

See also
Electronica, an electronic music genre
Consumer electronics, devices including active (amplifying) electrical components